"Out of Your Mind" is a song by UK garage duo True Steppers. It features Dane Bowers and Victoria Beckham, in her first appearance as a solo artist away from Spice Girls. The single was released on 14 August 2000 and reached number two on the UK Singles Chart, narrowly beaten to the top by Spiller's "Groovejet (If This Ain't Love)".

Background and composition
Explaining her collaboration with Dane Bowers, Beckham said she loved dance music and was "flattered" to be asked to sing on the track.

Chart performance
In the United Kingdom, the single was released the same week as Spiller featuring Sophie Ellis-Bextor's "Groovejet (If This Ain't Love)". Although "Out of Your Mind" was predicted to be number one until Saturday, "Groovejet" outsold it by 20,000 copies by Sunday, holding it back at the number-two position. "Out of Your Mind" sold 180,584 copies during its first week and has sold over 400,000 copies in the United Kingdom. It was certified Gold by the British Phonographic Industry and was the 21st-best-seller of 2000 in the UK.

Track listings
 UK and Australian CD single
 "Out of Your Mind"  – 3:27
 "Out of Your Mind"  – 4:12
 "Out of Your Mind"  – 4:25

 UK 12-inch single
 "Out of Your Mind"  – 5:02
 "Out of Your Mind"  – 4:12
 "Out of Your Mind"  – 4:30

UK cassette single and European CD single
 "Out of Your Mind"  – 3:25
 "Out of Your Mind"  – 4:12

Charts and certifications

Weekly charts

Year-end charts

Certifications

References

2000 songs
2000 debut singles
True Steppers songs
Dane Bowers songs
Victoria Beckham songs
Bertelsmann Music Group singles
NuLife singles
Music videos directed by Jake Nava
Songs written by Victoria Beckham